Edward Belbruno (born August 2, 1951, as a U.S. Citizen in Heidelberg, Germany) is an artist, mathematician and scientist whose interests are in celestial mechanics, dynamical systems, dynamical astronomy, and aerospace engineering. His artistic media is paintings, and his artwork in the NASA collection, Charles Betlach II collection, and exhibited in Paris, Rome, Los Angeles, Washington DC, New York City, Minneapolis, Shanghai, WeiHai, and Princeton.

Belbruno received his associate degree from Mitchell College, his Bachelor of Science degree in mathematics from New York University and his PhD in mathematics from New York University's Courant Institute in 1981, where his mentor was mathematician Jürgen Moser.

He was employed by the Jet Propulsion Laboratory from 1985 to 1990 as an orbital analyst on such missions as Galileo, Magellan, Cassini, Ulysses, Mars Observer, and others. During that time, he laid the foundations for the first systematic application of chaos theory to space flight originally called fuzzy boundary theory, which allows for the construction of very low energy paths for spacecraft.

In 1990 Belbruno applied his ideas for low energy transfer orbits to the Japanese lunar probe Hiten, which had been designed only for lunar swing-by and had suffered a failure of the Hagoromo lunar orbiter.  The main Hiten probe lacked the fuel to enter lunar orbit using a conventional Hohmann transfer trajectory, but Belbruno was able to devise a ballistic capture trajectory that would put it in lunar orbit using only a negligible amount of fuel.  The probe entered lunar orbit in 1991, the first time that Belbruno's ideas had been put to the test.

Belbruno had first proposed using a low-energy transfer orbit for a JPL probe in 1988.  However, he faced a great deal of skepticism, and found himself in conflict with engineers.  He had also expected to make no progress on Hiten, but the Japanese proved receptive to his ideas and called ballistic capture an "amazing result."  He left JPL in fall of 1990 and took a position at Pomona College.

Belbruno is president and founder of the company Innovative Orbital Design, Inc., based in Princeton, New Jersey and holds patents on routes in space.  He consulted on the rescue of the Asiasat-3 communications satellite for Hughes, although a different trajectory was ultimately used for the rescue.

Belbruno's books include Fly Me to the Moon and Capture Dynamics and Chaotic Motions in Celestial Mechanics.  He is a consultant with the National Aeronautics and Space Administration, and has made appearances on NBC's Today Show and NPR's Studio 360 entitled "Propelled to Paint".

In 2013, Belbruno gave a TED talk on his math, art, and science at TEDxJacksonHole 2013 Disrupt, which featured engaging visionaries and storytellers who shared ideas worth spreading centered around the theme of DISRUPT. The event was held before a packed house on October 5, 2013, at the Center for the Arts.

The abstract expressionist paintings of Ed Belbruno reflect both inner and outer realities. Belbruno is self-taught and draws inspiration from his subconscious and his personal life, but is also deeply influenced by his research in math, science, and astrophysics. Belbruno was featured at the Shanghai Art Fair, November 2–5, 2017 and the West Contemporary Arts Appreciation Society exhibition, in Weihai in 2018. An exhibition of his work at Agora Gallery (530 West 25th Street, New York) on Thursday, Nov. 14, 2019 included a screening of the documentary "Painting the Way to the Moon" and special guest Neil deGrasse Tyson.

A documentary by Jacob Okada called "Painting the Way to the Moon" explores the life, art, and science of NASA-JPL mathematician, Ed Belbruno, and includes a discussion on the nature of scientific creativity with Neil deGrasse Tyson. It won Best Feature Documentary at the Philip K. Dick, Boston Sci-Fi, and NYLA Film Festivals.

Belbruno was awarded the Humboldt Research Award in November, 2017 in recognition for his “Accomplishments in Research and Teaching in Mathematics as Applied to Celestial Mechanics, Astrodynamics and AstroPhysics”. The Humboldt Research Award is Germany's most prestigious award in mathematics and sciences which supported Belbruno in a yearlong stay in Germany at the University of Ausburg.

Currently, Belbruno is a Clinical Professor of Mathematics at Yeshiva University and a Visiting Research Collaborator at Princeton University.

See also 
 Interplanetary Transport Network

References

External links 
 
 Ed Belbruno's Official Art Fan Page
 SpaceRoutes.com
 2007-10-08 audio interview with Ed Belbruno on low-energy transfer
 Giant Impact Hypothesis of Moon formation

20th-century American mathematicians
21st-century American mathematicians
1951 births
Living people
NASA people
Jet Propulsion Laboratory
Courant Institute of Mathematical Sciences alumni
Pomona College faculty